Dysnomia (formally (136199) Eris I Dysnomia) is the only known moon of the dwarf planet Eris and is likely the second-largest known moon of a dwarf planet, after Pluto I Charon. It was discovered in September 2005 by Mike Brown and the Laser Guide Star Adaptive Optics (LGSAO) team at the W. M. Keck Observatory. It carried the provisional designation of  until it was officially named Dysnomia (from the Ancient Greek word  meaning anarchy/lawlessness) in September 2006, after the daughter of the Greek goddess Eris.

Discovery 
During 2005, the adaptive optics team at the Keck telescopes in Hawaii carried out observations of the four brightest Kuiper belt objects (Pluto, and ), using the newly commissioned laser guide star adaptive optics system. Observations taken on September 10, 2005, revealed a moon in orbit around Eris, provisionally designated . In keeping with the Xena nickname that was already in use for Eris, the moon was nicknamed "Gabrielle" by its discoverers, after Xena's sidekick.

Physical characteristics 

This diameter estimate makes Dysnomia around the 20th-largest known object in the trans-Neptunian region. Of the known moons of dwarf planets, only Charon is larger than Dysnomia. Dysnomia's low albedo significantly contrasts with Eris's extremely high albedo of 0.96; its surface has been described to be darker than coal, which is a typical characteristic seen in trans-Neptunian objects around Dysnomia's size.

The shape of Dysnomia is not known, but it should have a fairly spherical shape given its large diameter and mass; it is larger than the three smallest ellipsoidal moons of Saturn and Uranus (Enceladus, Mimas, and Miranda).

The brightness difference between Dysnomia and Eris decreases with longer and redder wavelengths; Hubble Space Telescope observations show that Dysnomia is 500 times fainter than Eris (6.70-magnitude difference) in visible light, whereas near-infrared Keck telescope observations show that Dysnomia is ~60 times fainter (4.43-magnitude difference) than Eris. This indicates Dysnomia has a very different spectrum and redder color than Eris, indicating a significantly darker surface which has been proven by submillimeter observations.

Orbit 
Combining Keck and Hubble observations, the orbit of Dysnomia was used to determine the mass of Eris through Kepler's third law of planetary motion. This shows that the mass of Eris is 1.27 times that of Pluto. Over the course of Dysnomia's orbit, its distance from Eris varies by  due to its slightly eccentric orbit.

Dynamical simulations of Dysnomia suggest that its orbit should have completely circularized through mutual tidal interactions with Eris within timescales of 5–17 million years, regardless of the moon's density. A non-zero eccentricity would thus mean that Dysnomia's orbit is being perturbed, possibly due to the presence of an additional inner satellite of Eris. However, it is possible that the measured eccentricity is not real, but due to interference of the measurements by albedo features, or to systematic errors.

From Hubble observations from 2005 to 2018, the inclination of Dysnomia's orbit with respect to Eris's heliocentric orbit is calculated to be approximately 78°. Since the inclination is less than 90°, Dysnomia's orbit is therefore prograde relative to Eris's orbit. In 2239, Eris and Dysnomia will enter a period of mutual events in which Dysnomia's orbital plane is aligned edge-on to the Sun, allowing for Eris and Dysnomia to take turns eclipsing each other.

Formation 

Astronomers now know that the six brightest Kuiper belt objects (KBOs) have satellites. Among the fainter members of the belt only about 10% are known to have satellites. This is thought to imply that collisions between large KBOs have been frequent in the past. A similar mechanism is thought to have led to the formation of the Moon when Earth was struck by a giant impactor early in the history of the Solar System.

Name 

Mike Brown, the moon's discoverer, chose the name Dysnomia for the moon. As the daughter of Eris, the mythological Dysnomia fit the established pattern of naming moons after gods associated with the primary body (hence, Jupiter's largest moons are named after lovers of Jupiter, while Saturn's are named after his fellow Titans). Also, the English translation of "Dysnomia", "lawlessness", echoes Lucy Lawless, the actress who played Xena in Xena: Warrior Princess on television. Before receiving their official names, Eris and Dysnomia had been nicknamed "Xena" and "Gabrielle", though Brown states that the connection was accidental.

A primary reason for the name was its similarity to the name of Brown's wife, Diane, following a pattern established with Pluto. Pluto owes its name in part to its first two letters, which form the initials of Percival Lowell, the founder of the observatory where its discoverer, Clyde Tombaugh, was working, and the person who inspired the search for "Planet X". James Christy, who discovered Charon, did something similar by adding the Greek ending -on to Char, the nickname of his wife Charlene. (Christy wasn't aware that the resulting 'Charon' was a figure in Greek mythology.) "Dysnomia", similarly, has the same first letter as Brown's wife, Diane.

Notes

References

External links
 

Moons of dwarf planets
Eris (dwarf planet)
Discoveries by Michael E. Brown
20050910
Discoveries by Chad Trujillo
Discoveries by David L. Rabinowitz